Zemplínske Hradište is a village and municipality in the Trebišov District in the Košice Region of south-eastern Slovakia.

History
In historical records the village was first mentioned in 1328. It was a majority Hungarian village until after 1920 when the town became part of the newly created Czechoslovakia. In the 1940s (after WWII) Hungarians were forced to leave, (forcibly expelled) and Slovaks were given free homes to occupy. Those who did not leave became assimilated and now consider themselves to be Slovaks.

Geography
The village lies at an altitude of 103 metres and covers an area of 20.164 km².
It has a population of about 1150 people.

Ethnicity
The village is about 94% Slovak and 6% Hungarian.

Facilities
The village has a public library, a gym and a football pitch.

Bocianopolis - Zemplinske Hradiste
https://web.archive.org/web/20070513023228/http://www.statistics.sk/mosmis/eng/run.html

Villages and municipalities in Trebišov District
Zemplín (region)